J. Michael Springmann was the head of the American visa bureau in Jeddah, Saudi Arabia, in the Reagan and former Bush administrations, from September 1987 through March 1989.

Claims Regarding Unqualified Visa Applicants and Firing 
While stationed in Saudi Arabia, Springmann was "ordered by high level State Dept officials to issue visas to unqualified applicants". Springmann states that these applicants were terrorist recruits of Osama Bin Laden, who were being sent to the United States in order to obtain training from the CIA. Springmann issued complaints to "higher authorities at several agencies", but they've been unanswered. The State Department has stated that the consular officer had final authority in issuing the visas, not Springmann.

From cited CBC Interview:

Following Springmann's complaints, he was fired by the State Department.

Foreign Policy Matters 

Springmann opposes the Saudi war against Yemen and said that Yemenis should not trust Biden that he is going to end the Saudi war on Yemen as he promised during his campaign.

Writings 
Springman is also the author of "Goodbye, Europe? Hello, chaos?: Merkel's migrant bomb" in which he argues that "US foreign policy created the crisis. Destabilizing nations through invasion and espionage furthers US goals in the Middle East, he argues, creating migrant waves guided northward and westward to destabilize the European Union in general and Germany in particular. Germany’s own refugee program, designed to exploit migrants as cheap labor, made US intelligence efforts all the easier." (Quoted from summary at the book's entry at Worldcat).

One can assume, that he is also the author of the academic thesis "American-Russian economic relations, 1943-1947" submitted to the Catholic University of America in 1972.

"Visas for Al Qaeda" has been translated to German and published by the rather right wing Kopp Verlag. "Goodbye, Europe? Hello, chaos?“ has been published in Spanish translation.

Bibliography

References

External links
 Interview of Springman for "The Association for Diplomatic Studies and Training Foreign Affairs Oral History Project" by Charles Stuart Kennedy, started 1994, Copyright 1998 ADST (PDF)

Living people
Criticism of the official accounts of the September 11 attacks
September 11 attacks
United States Department of State officials
Year of birth missing (living people)